Calpanthula is a genus of cnidarians belonging to the family Botrucnidiferidae.

Species:
 Calpanthula guinensis Van Beneden, 1897

References

Botrucnidiferidae
Anthozoa genera